Derryvullan is a civil parish and townland (of 296 acres) in County Fermanagh, Northern Ireland. The civil parish is situated in the historic baronies of Tirkennedy and Lurg. Derryvullan townland is in the portion of the parish of the same name in Tirkennedy.

The ruins of an 18th-century church mark the site of an early church in Derryvullan.

Civil parish of Derryvullan
The civil parish includes the villages of Irvinestown  and Lisnarick and the house at Castle Coole.

Townlands
The civil parish includes the following townlands:

A
Agharainy, Arda, Ardlougher, Aughey

B
Ballindullagh Inward, Ballindullagh Outward, Ballintarsan, Ballymactaggart, Boyaghan, Bracky, Brownhill, Bunaninver, Burfits Hill

C
Cantytrindle, Carran Little, Carranboy, Carry, Cassidy, Castle Coole, Castle Irvine Demesne, Cavanacross, Cavancarragh, Clenaghisle, Cloghcor, Coolaness, Coolbuck, Coolisk, Crockaleen, Cules Long, Cules Short, Cullaghmore, Cultiagh, Curraghlare

D
Derrybeg, Derryclawan, Derryhillagh, Derrynanny, Derryveone, Derryvullan, Doonan, Dring, Drogan, Dromore, Drumadravy, Drumaran, Drumarky, Drumbo, Drumbulcan, Drumcaw, Drumcrin, Drumcrooil, Drumduff, Drumhirk, Drumhoney, Druminshin Beg, Druminshin More, Druminshinardagh, Drummal, Drummee, Drummonaghan, Drumpeen, Drumsara, Drumshane, Drumskool, Drumsluice, Drumskea, Duross

E
Ederdaglass	(also known as Hollybank)

F
Farnaght, Feddan, Forthill

G
Gaffer Island, Glenall, Glenkeen, Glenross, Gortmessan, Gull Rock

H
Hollybank (also known as Ederdaglass), Horse Island, County Fermanagh, Horse Island

I
Inish Conra, Inish Dacharne, Inish Davar, Inish Divann, Inish Doney, Inish Garve, Isle Namanfin

K
Keeran, Killyvannan, Knock Island, Knockroe (Archdall), Knockroe (Irvine)

L
Lackaghboy, Leambreslen, Levaghy, Lignameeltoge, Liscreevin, Lisreagh, Lissan

M
Milltate, Milltate, Monalla, Moneykee, Mountdrum, Moynaghan North, Moynaghan South, Mullies, Mullybrack, Mullybreslen, Mulrod

R
Rahall, Rossachrin, Rossclare, Rossfad, Rossgweer, Rossigh, Rossinnan, Rossmore

S
Shallany, Shankill, Slee, County Fermanagh, Slee

T
Tamlaght, Tatnamallaght, Tattygare, Tattymacall, Tedd, Townhill, Tully, Tullyclea, Tullylammy, Tullynagarn

W
Whitehill North, Whitehill South

See also 
List of townlands in County Fermanagh
List of civil parishes of County Fermanagh

References

Townlands of County Fermanagh